Francisco Sérgio García, also commonly known as Fransérgio (born 8 May 1948) is a Brazilian basketball player. He competed in the men's tournament at the 1972 Summer Olympics.

References

1948 births
Living people
Brazilian men's basketball players
Olympic basketball players of Brazil
Basketball players at the 1972 Summer Olympics
Basketball players from São Paulo
Franca Basquetebol Clube players
20th-century Brazilian people